Alfred Young (4 November 1905 in Sunderland – 30 August 1977) was a professional footballer who played as a defender for Huddersfield Town between 1927 and 1945. He also played for Durham City and York City.

He played for England nine times between 1932 and 1938, including the infamous 6–3 win against Germany in Berlin in 1938.

He was also one of Denmark's caretaker managers during the 1950s. He also coached Esbjerg fB.

References 

1905 births
1977 deaths
Footballers from Sunderland
English footballers
England international footballers
English Football League players
Association football defenders
Huddersfield Town A.F.C. players
Durham City A.F.C. players
York City F.C. players
Køge Boldklub managers
SK Brann managers
Esbjerg fB managers
Denmark national football team managers
Expatriate football managers in Denmark
English Football League representative players
English football managers
FA Cup Final players